Child of Glass is the debut album by Blutengel. A 25th anniversary edition remaster of the album was released with a bonus disc of rare tracks.

Track listing

Info
 All tracks written and produced by Christian "Chris" Pohl
 Male vocals by Chris Pohl
 Female vocals on "Weg Zu Mir", by Kati Roloff
 Lyrics and female vocals on "Desire", "Suicide" & "Love" by Nina Bendigkeit
 Female vocals on "Footworship", by Kati Roloff and Nina Bendigkeit

"Love" was an unreleased track from the Child of Glass recording sessions, which was later released on the 1998 compilation Awake The Machines Vol.2

Nina Bendigkeit left the band after the album release to become a photographer and was replaced by Gini Martin in 2001.

A 2015 rework of Weg zu Mir was released on the In Alle Ewigkeit EP as a teaser for Nemesis: The Best of & Reworked.

References

External links
 Blutengel Discography Info

1999 debut albums
Blutengel albums